Chathian Wala is a town and Union Council of Kasur District in the Punjab province of Pakistan. It is part of Kasur Tehsil and is located at 31°18'0N 74°31'0E with an altitude of 207 metres (682 feet).

The town was the main centre for the Gulabdasi sect.

References

Kasur District